Boren is a lake in Östergötland, east of Motala, 73 m above sea level. It covers an area of 28 km² and is at most 14 meters deep. It forms a part of the Göta Canal and has given its name to Borensberg.

References 

Lakes of Östergötland County